Pârâul Mănăstirii is the name of some rivers in Romania:
 Pârâul Mănăstirii (Bistrița) - tributary of the Bistriţa River
 Pârâul Mănăstirii (Olt) - tributary of the Olt River